Tongwynlais railway station served Tongwynlais in South Wales.

History
The station was opened by the Cardiff Railway. Compared with the others on the line, Tongwynlais was one of the larger stations. It had two long platforms with a substantial wooden building on the up side. The platforms were linked with a metal footbridge. The 'down' platform closed on 16 May 1928 when the track was singled. The station closed to both goods and passengers in 1931. In 1947, the line re-opened, but the station did not.

After closure
Despite having been closed for 30 years, the station remained in a reasonable condition for a long time, and the station building was still standing in 1961. However, no trace of the  station remains, as it has since been buried under the A470 road.

Notes

References
Hutton, John (2009). An Illustrated History of Cardiff Docks. Silver Link Publishing

Railway stations in Great Britain opened in 1911
Railway stations in Great Britain closed in 1931
Disused railway stations in Cardiff
Former Cardiff Railway stations
1911 establishments in Wales
1931 disestablishments in Wales